Angraecum crassum is a species of orchid.

crassum